This is a comprehensive list of all notable alumni and faculty (past and present) of Damelin.

Alumni

Faculty and staff

References

Damelin